The Atlantic Collegiate Baseball League (ACBL) is a collegiate summer baseball league operating in the Mid-Atlantic region of the United States. The league has experienced moderate success in having alumni appear in Major League Baseball. Fourteen alumni of the league were invited to spring training with Major League Baseball clubs in 2010.

The ACBL is one of eleven leagues in the National Alliance of College Summer Baseball.

Teams
The teams participating in the 2020 season are:

Former teams
Many different teams have played in the ACBL throughout the history of the league.  The following is a list of former teams: Allentown Wings, Berkshire Red Sox, Brooklyn Clippers, Brooklyn-Queens Dodgers, Connecticut Yankees, Delaware Valley Gulls, Jersey City Colonels, Kutztown Rockies,  Lehigh Valley Catz, Long Island Collegians, Long Island Flying A's, Long Island Nationals, Long Island Sound, Long Island Stars, Mercer Titans, Metro New York Cadets, Monmouth Royals, Mt. Vernon Generals, Nassau Collegians, New Jersey A's, New Jersey Colts, New York Generals, Peekskill Robins, Scranton Red Soxx, Staten Island Tide, Teaneck Teamsters, Torrington Titans, and West Deptford Green Storm.

Major league alumni

Nick Ahmed, infielder
Garvin Alston, pitcher
Scott Arnold, pitcher
Mike Avilés, infielder
Kevin Baez, infielder
Kevin Barry, pitcher
Kevin Bearse, pitcher
Jason Bergmann, pitcher
Craig Biggio, infielder (AS, HOF)
Frank Brooks, pitcher
Terry Bross, pitcher
Kirk Bullinger, pitcher
Nate Bump, pitcher
Fred Cambria, pitcher
Cody Carroll, pitcher
Kevin Cash, catcher
Rick Cerone, catcher
Vinnie Chulk, pitcher
Mark Ciardi, pitcher
Frank Cimorelli, pitcher
Jeff Datz, catcher
Doug Davis, infielder
Jason Dellaero, infielder
Rich DeLucia, pitcher
Mark DiFelice, pitcher
Benny Distefano, player
John Doherty, pitcher
Angel Echevarria, outfielder
Brad Eldred, infielder
Frank Eufemia, pitcher
Steve Falteisek, pitcher
John Flaherty, catcher
Scott Forster, pitcher
Willie Fraser, pitcher
Danny Garcia, outfielder
Ray Giannelli, infielder
Keith Glauber, pitcher
Zack Godley, pitcher
Don Gordon, pitcher
Reid Gorecki, outfielder
Tom Gregorio, catcher
Kevin Gryboski, pitcher
John Halama, pitcher
Craig Hansen, pitcher
Pete Harnisch, pitcher (AS)
Joel Johnston, pitcher
Skip Jutze, catcher
Pat Kelly, infielder
Matt Kinzer, pitcher
Phil Klein, pitcher
Mike Koplove, pitcher
Kyle Kubitza, infielder
Jeff Kunkel, infielder
Al Lachowicz, pitcher
Rick Lancellotti, infielder
John Lannan, pitcher
Gene Larkin, player
Dennis Leonard, pitcher
Brian Lesher, outfielder
Brian Looney, pitcher
Mike Loynd, pitcher
Rob Lukachyk, pinch hitter
Zach Lutz, infielder
Joe Martinez, pitcher
Jim Mecir, pitcher
Frank Menechino, infielder
Ray Montgomery, outfielder
Dan Morogiello, pitcher
Matt Morris, pitcher (AS)
Jamie Moyer, pitcher (AS)
Terry Mulholland, pitcher (AS)
Sean Nolin, pitcher
Keith Osik, catcher
Charlie Puleo, pitcher
Steve Ratzer, pitcher
Chris Reed, pitcher
C. J. Riefenhauser, pitcher
Wayne Rosenthal, pitcher
Mo Sanford, pitcher
Jeff Schaefer, infielder
Rich Scheid, pitcher
Frank Schwindel, infielder
Frank Seminara, pitcher
Jim Stoops, pitcher
Drew Sutton, outfielder
Nick Tropeano, pitcher
Bob Tufts, pitcher
John Valentin, infielder
Anthony Varvaro, pitcher
Frank Viola, pitcher (AS, CY)
Ryan Vogelsong, pitcher (AS)
Pete Walker, pitcher
Allen Watson, pitcher
Walt Weiss, infielder (AS)
Ed Whited, infielder
Darrin Winston, pitcher
Ron Witmeyer, infielder
Eric Young, infielder (AS)
Pete Zoccolillo, outfielder

References

External links
Official website

Summer baseball leagues
College baseball leagues in the United States
Baseball leagues in New Jersey
Baseball leagues in New York (state)
Baseball leagues in Pennsylvania
1967 establishments in the United States
Sports leagues established in 1967
College baseball in New York (state)
College baseball in Pennsylvania